Breitung Charter Township is a charter township of Dickinson County in the U.S. state of Michigan.  As of the 2020 census, the township population was 5,831.

History
The township is named after Edward Breitung, a miner and U.S. Representative from Michigan.

Communities
The cities of Iron Mountain and Kingsford are in the southwest of the township, but are administratively autonomous.
Merriman is an unincorporated community on M-95 about seven miles north of Iron Mountain at 
Quinnesec is an unincorporated community, defined as a census-designated place in the township, just east of Kingsford and Iron Mountain.
Skidmore is an unincorporated community.

Geography

Demographics

As of the census of 2000, there were 5,930 people, 2,354 households, and 1,727 families residing in the township. The racial makeup of the township was 98.35% White, 0.03% African American, 0.44% Native American, 0.47% Asian, 0.12% from other races, and 0.59% from two or more races. Hispanic or Latino of any race were 0.44% of the population. 18.9% were of German, 14.6% Italian, 12.9% Swedish, 7.9% English, 7.1% French, 6.0% Finnish, 6.0% French Canadian and 5.1% Irish ancestry according to Census 2000.

There were 2,354 households, out of which 31.4% had children under the age of 18 living with them, 65.2% were married couples living together, 5.3% had a female householder with no husband present, and 26.6% were non-families. 22.9% of all households were made up of individuals, and 12.0% had someone living alone who was 65 years of age or older.  The average household size was 2.50 and the average family size was 2.94.

In the township the population was spread out, with 24.8% under the age of 18, 5.4% from 18 to 24, 26.6% from 25 to 44, 27.0% from 45 to 64, and 16.3% who were 65 years of age or older.  The median age was 42 years. For every 100 females, there were 102.0 males.  For every 100 females age 18 and over, there were 98.5 males.

The median income for a household in the township was $39,820, and the median income for a family was $47,151. Males had a median income of $40,841 versus $25,725 for females. The per capita income for the township was $18,920.  About 2.7% of families and 4.6% of the population were below the poverty line, including 2.5% of those under age 18 and 7.6% of those age 65 or over.

References

External links
Breitung Township, Michigan

Townships in Dickinson County, Michigan
Charter townships in Michigan
Iron Mountain micropolitan area